Lara de Liedekerke-Meier (born 6 February 1988) is a Belgian equestrian. She competed in the individual eventing at the 2020 Summer Olympics.

References

External links
 

1988 births
Living people
Belgian female equestrians
Olympic equestrians of Belgium
Equestrians at the 2020 Summer Olympics
People from Uccle
Event riders
Sportspeople from Brussels